October 1970 is an eight-part made-for-television series that played on Canadian television in October and November 2006. It is a dramatization of the actual events surrounding the October Crisis in the Canadian province of Quebec, when members of the militant separatist group Front de libération du Québec abducted British Trade Commissioner James Cross and then Pierre Laporte, the Vice-Premier and Minister of Labour of Quebec, the latter of whom they murdered.

Cast 
 Patrick Labbé as Julien Giguère
 Karine Vanasse as Christine (fictional character designed by combining Carole Devault with Louise Verreault)
 Denis Bernard as Pierre Laporte
 Hugh Thompson as McLeery
 Mathieu Grondin as Jacques Lanctôt
 Fanny La Croix as Louise Lanctôt
 Mark Day as Mark Lepage
 Gary Levert as Michel St-Louis (reporter)
 Eric Paulhus as Bernard Lortie
 Hugo Saint-Cyr as Paul Rose
 R.H. Thomson as James Cross
 Paul Doucet as Jean-Marc
 Derek Moran as Branko
  as Sgt Albert Lisacek

Reception 
October 1970 was severely criticised by articles of and letters to Le Devoir :
 How to become a hero "If he is still alive, [Giguère] must be dying of laughter »
 To be seen sep 12 on TV, the series in French "...clearly distorted for dramatisation purposes »
 Radio-Canada (the French-language counterpart of CBC) was doubtful of the series' quality
 Letters about the series October 1970, by Jacques Lanctôt himself
 CBC's series about FLQ : War, yes my colonel "...giving back life, against all historical obviousness, to the ludicrous idea of a plot aiming to institute a temporary government in October 1970."

References

External links 
 

2006 television films
2006 films
Canadian drama television films
2000s Canadian television miniseries
Television shows filmed in Quebec
October Crisis
CBC Television original films
Canadian political drama television series
Films directed by Don McBrearty
2000s Canadian films